Tezze sul Brenta is a town in the province of Vicenza, Veneto, Italy. It is northeast of SP51.

Sources

(Google Maps)

Cities and towns in Veneto